Son of Beast was a record-breaking wooden roller coaster at Kings Island in Mason, Ohio, United States. Built and designed by the now-defunct Roller Coaster Corporation of America (RCCA), it opened to the public on April 28, 2000, as the tallest and fastest wooden coaster in the world; these records have never been broken. Son of Beast was themed as a sequel to one of the park's other signature attractions, The Beast.

Two major, non-fatal accidents occurred on Son of Beast during its existence. In 2006, a crack formed in a wooden track beam resulting in a slight dip that severely jolted riders, with many reporting head and neck injuries. In 2009, a rider reported a severe head injury stemming from a burst blood vessel, and the ride was closed indefinitely. After sitting idle for years, the coaster permanently closed in July 2012 when Kings Island announced that the roller coaster would be removed from the park. A new steel coaster, Banshee, opened in its place in 2014, and a tombstone prop paying homage to the Son of Beast was placed in the ride's line queue. The station of Son of Beast is still standing and was used during the Halloween Haunt season between 2010 and 2019.

History

Construction

The Roller Coaster Corporation of America (RCCA) discussed the idea of building the world's first wooden hypercoaster with Kings Island in 1997. The park announced plans to build Son of Beast on May 11, 1999. As part of a marketing campaign for the ride before its debut, a box was placed next to a footpath in the park. Beastly growling and snarling noises came from inside the box as it shook violently. During the announcement, the box was revealed to the audience along with a model of the roller coaster and a list of seven world records that would be broken when it came into operation. The sign at the ride's entrance featured a large wooden box covered with chains, rope, and metal straps. The front was ripped open with the name "Son of Beast" centered inside the box.

Although the Roller Coaster Company of Ohio was officially recorded as the ride's designer, that company was actually an affiliate of RCCA. The primary structural engineer was Wooden Structures Inc. of Georgia, while the lumber was manufactured by Universal Forest Products of Hamilton, Ohio. Problems plagued the ride from the beginning and, as a result, Paramount Parks, the park's then-owner, fired RCCA before construction was completed. The park had to make several design corrections during Son of Beast's initial year.

On January 11, 2000, a portion of the ride was damaged due to a strong gust of wind. It was later revealed that the second hill had collapsed by itself. The wooden structure was being held in place by a temporary ribbon support system and had been constructed only a day earlier. The ride was planned to open on April 14, 2000, but construction was halted due to rainy weather. As a result, the coaster's opening had to be delayed. In addition, in February 2000, the Occupational Safety and Health Administration fined Paramount $110,000 after discovering 18 safety violations, including 11 that were deemed "serious", during two inspections.

Operation
Son of Beast originally opened to the public on April 28, 2000. The day after the ride opened, officials discovered defects in a  section of track. Son of Beast closed for repair work soon afterward, undergoing three weeks of repairs. It then reopened on May 26, 2000. From the start, Son of Beast had a reputation for being rough. Passengers were being jerked around during the ride experience. This issue was said to be caused by structural issues. The only smooth path of the ride was the vertical loop. The ride originally operated with three trains designed by Premier Rides; each consisted of six cars for a total capacity of thirty-six. 

Kings Island filed a lawsuit in November 2000 against three companies involved in the design and manufacture of the roller coaster, claiming defects that delayed the initial opening and resulted in multiple closures. In 2005, a federal court ruled that the Roller Coaster Company of Ohio's insurer, Admiral Insurance, had to pay Kings Island $20 million in damages in relation to the lawsuit. However, the ruling was overturned by an appeals court in 2008.

The trains were shortened to five cars before the 2006 season. The ride experienced its first major incident on July 9, 2006, during which 27 passengers were sent to the hospital following a derailment. The ride was closed for the remainder of the 2006 season while Kings Island replaced the Premier trains with lighter models. Two trains designed by Gerstlauer from the demolished Hurricane: Category 5 coaster at the Myrtle Beach Pavilion were purchased by Kings Island to serve as lighter replacements for the original Son of Beast trains. The lighter trains were used to reduce the overall load on the wooden structure. To help the lighter trains complete the circuit, the loop was removed in January 2007 and recycled for scrap. The park claimed that the changes helped make the ride more comfortable. Son of Beast reopened on July 4, 2007. Despite the loss of the vertical loop, the coaster continued to hold the record as tallest and fastest wooden roller coaster in the world.

Closure and demolition

Another major incident occurred in May 2009 in which a woman reported that she had been severely injured after riding Son of Beast. Kings Island officials heard of the incident on June 16 and closed the ride within a week. The coaster did not reopen for the 2009 season. Kings Island officials received three proposals to repair Son of Beast, one of which they rejected outright. References to Son of Beast were removed from the park's website and map in early 2010. All signage, including the box at the entrance, was also removed. At the time, the ride had accommodated an estimated 7 million guests throughout its history.

On March 15, 2010, the General Manager of Kings Island, Greg Scheid, stated that the park had spent nearly $30 million on the ride to date and that it would not reopen for the 2010 season. However, at the start of the 2010 Halloween Haunt season, Son of Beast's station was opened for a haunted house called Wolf Pack. The station is still standing and was used yearly to host Wolf Pack during the Halloween Haunt season until 2019. Another Kings Island spokesperson, Don Helbig, announced in 2011 that the ride would again be closed for the 2011 season and that the ride's future had not yet been decided. "No decision has been made concerning the ride's future," spokesman Don Helbig said. "It would be inappropriate to speculate on when a decision might be made. There's nothing else to talk about." Kings Island announced on April 24, 2012, that there were no plans to operate Son of Beast in 2012, and they were still evaluating options.

On July 27, 2012, following a thorough evaluation of the roller coaster, Kings Island announced that Son of Beast would be removed from the park to make room for future expansion. Demolition began in mid-September 2012. During the demolition of Son of Beast, Kings Island sold plaques with a piece of the ride's track for $99.99. Park officials offered pieces of the wood structure for $49.99 and structural bolts for $24.99. On November 20, one of the last remaining parts of the structure, the lift hill, was demolished. A new roller coaster called Banshee was completed in April 2014 and is now in the same location previously occupied by Son of Beast. A tombstone with a plaque honoring Son of Beast was placed in the mockup graveyard near the entrance of the new roller coaster.

In 2018, Kings Island released posters that referenced Son of Beast's station, Outpost 5, leading some to speculate that a possible revival might be announced by the park. However, these rumors were unsubstantiated, and no such announcement was made.

Layout
After loading the train, riders left the station making a  left-hand drop into a series of short hops before turning into the  lift hill. At the crest of the lift hill, the track made a left-hand turn over to the first drop, where it dropped  to the ground followed by a 70-degree banked turn to the right. Riders then descended  down a second drop into a left-hand double helix. Coming out of the helix, the train passed through a mid-course brake run dropping into a straight section of track (where the vertical loop was prior to 2006), before entering another helix, riding a series of short hills, and ending at the final brake run. One cycle of the ride lasted about 2 minutes and 20 seconds.

The superstructure of the roller coaster used yellow pine, while the track piles were made of Douglas fir. Son of Beast was supported by 2,414 footers, which extended  into the ground. Before the loop was removed in December 2006, it had a steel structure and a wooden track. About  of timber were used in Son of Beast's construction, and the ride itself covered .

World records

At the time of its introduction in 2000, Son of Beast was the only wooden roller coaster nationally ranked in the top 10 for track height, track length, drop height, and speed. It set several world records becoming the tallest and fastest wooden roller coaster in the world, as well as becoming the second longest following its predecessor, The Beast. In addition, when it opened, Son of Beast was the only wooden roller coaster to feature a vertical loop. The loop was removed prior to the 2007 season. Many records have never been surpassed by another wooden roller coaster. If Son of Beast were still standing today, it would be the tallest and fastest wooden coaster in the world, and it would have the world's longest drop.

The seven world records held at its introduction were:
 Tallest wooden roller coaster
 Longest wooden roller coaster drop
 Fastest wooden roller coaster
 Only looping wooden roller coaster (2000–2006)
 Longest looping roller coaster (2000–2006)
 Most wooden coaster track at one park

Incidents

From 2000 to 2009, the Ohio Department of Agriculture (ODA) recorded six incidents in which people were injured after riding Son of Beast. Son of Beast recorded more incidents than any other ride in Ohio during that period, when ODA recorded 65 such incidents on amusement rides across the state.

Only one of the six incidents recorded on Son of Beast, the derailment in 2006, was caused by structural issues with the ride itself. Of the other five incidents, two riders broke their necks within a four-week period in 2001; both riders had ankylosing spondylitis, a rare condition of arthritis in the spine. A third rider suffered fractured vertebrae after riding Son of Beast in 2003, but ODA officials were unable to determine whether the rider had a preexisting medical condition because she refused to be interviewed. In 2007, a fourth rider died one day after riding Son of Beast after complaining of back pain. The fifth incident, in 2009, resulted in the ride's permanent closure.

2006

In the evening of July 9, 2006, a structural failure in the 'Rose Bowl' section of the ride formed a "slight dip" in the track that created a "pothole effect". A train running on the track passed over the area severely jolting riders. After the train returned to the station and riders complained of injuries, the next train ascending the lift hill was halted. There were 27 sent to the hospital, many reporting head, and neck injuries, with all but two being released the same day. None of the injuries were life-threatening. After an inspection the following day, the park stated that the accident was caused by a crack or split in the wood. The ride was shut down for an extended period of time, while the park worked with the State of Ohio to complete a full investigation. The park completed repairs of the ride but the state asked for extensive testing to be done to ensure it would not happen again. The park indicated that the ride would not reopen until the 2007 season. 

After the 2006 incident, the trains were replaced with lighter models before the ride reopened the following season. The loop was also removed during this time. The riders injured in the 2006 incident filed five lawsuits, four of which were settled out-of-court. In the fifth lawsuit, a judge ruled that Kings Island had to pay over $76,000 in compensatory damages. Forensic investigator Rick Schmizze testified that Kings Island had known since 2000 that the ride had major issues with swaying, but that park officials had not done enough to fix the problem. Kings Island settled the last lawsuit in 2011.

2009
On June 16, 2009, a woman claimed to have suffered a head injury from riding Son of Beast during her visit to the park on May 31, 2009. She did not report the incident to Kings Island officials before June 16. She claimed to have suffered from a burst blood vessel in her brain, after riding Son of Beast, that required admission to an intensive care unit at a nearby hospital. "The first we heard of this was on June 16. Her visit was on May 31 and there's no record of going to first aid for anything here at the park," said Don Helbig, public relations manager for Kings Island. Helbig also pointed out that there were no other reports of injuries on the ride that year. Son of Beast was shut down as a precaution, however, during the investigation. "At this point, it would be inappropriate to speculate on an exact date when the ride may reopen. We're going to do a thorough maintenance review. We're going to work with the state of Ohio on that," said Helbig.

An investigation followed, and no irregularities were found with the ride. A summary of that investigation was released later, on July 29. Despite the vindicating findings, the roller coaster never reopened.

Rankings

See also
List of former Kings Island attractions
The Beast (roller coaster)

Notes

References

External links

Son of Beast Preview and Construction Photos of the construction on Ultimate Rollercoaster.com
Son of Beast news and pictures from Coastergallery.com
Kings Island Central information – Alternate source of details and stats
Son Of Beast Video – Coasterimage.com

Roller coasters operated by Cedar Fair
Former roller coasters in Ohio
Buildings and structures demolished in 2012
Demolished buildings and structures in Ohio